Activated RNA polymerase II transcriptional coactivator p15 also known as positive cofactor 4 (PC4) or SUB1 homolog is a protein that in humans is encoded by the SUB1 gene.  The human SUB1 gene is named after an orthologous gene in yeast.

SUB1 is induced by oxidative stress, and is involved in coordinating cellular responses to DNA strand breaks that arise after oxidative stress. Yeast SUB1 has structural and functional similarities to human alpha-synuclein, a protein that has an important role in Parkinson’s disease. Like SUB1, alpha-synuclein functions in regulating DNA repair including repair of DNA double-strand breaks.

Interactions 

SUB1 has been shown to interact with CSTF2.

References

Further reading

External links